Alexander Viklund (born December 28, 1990) is a Swedish professional ice hockey player. He is currently playing with IF Björklöven of the HockeyAllsvenskan (Allsv).

Viklund made his HockeyAllsvenskan debut playing with BIK Karlskoga during the 2010–11 HockeyAllsvenskan season. He later made his top tiered Swedish Hockey League debut with Karlskrona HK in the 2015–16 season.

References

External links

1990 births
Living people
IF Björklöven players
Bofors IK players
Chilliwack Bruins players
BIK Karlskoga players
Karlskrona HK players
Swedish ice hockey forwards
People from Piteå
Västerviks IK players
Sportspeople from Norrbotten County